1975–76 was the first season that Division 1 operated as the second tier of ice hockey in Sweden, this due to the creation of Elitserien (now the SHL) as a new flight of the Swedish hockey system.

Division 1 was divided into four starting groups, based on geography. The top four teams in the group would continue to the playoffs to determine which clubs would participate in the qualifier for promotion to Elitserien. The bottom two teams in each group were relegated to Division 2 for the 1976–77 season.

Regular season

Division 1 Norra ("North")

Division 1 Östra ("East")

Division 1 Södra ("South")

Division 1 Västra ("West")

Playoffs
The 16 teams (top 4 in the standings from each regular season group) that qualified for the playoffs all played two playoff rounds, leaving four surviving teams that continued to the 1976 Elitserien qualifier.

The format for the playoffs was a two-leg home-and-home series.  Matches could end in a draw.  If each team won one match, the result was decided by a sudden-death overtime, not by total goals over the two matches.

Björklöven, Mora, Örebro and Nacka won in the second round to continue to the 1976 Elitserien qualifier.

Round 1
IF Björklöven defeats Grums IK
First leg: IF Björklöven 5–1 Grums IK  (0–0, 1–1, 4–0, attendance: 2,132)
Second leg: Grums IK 2–10 IF Björklöven (1–3, 1–3, 0–4, attendance: 775)
Strömsbro IF defeats Kiruna AIF
First leg: Kiruna AIF 2–3 Strömsbro IF (1–1, 1–0, 0–2, attendance: 2,127)
Second leg: Strömsbro IF 2–8 Kiruna AIF (0–3, 1–4, 1–1, attendance 1,549)Strömsbro IF wins in sudden-death overtime
Mora IK defeats IFK Luleå
First leg: Mora IK 9–5 IFK Luleå (3–1, 2–2, 4–2, attendance 1,920)
Second leg: IFK Luleå 2–6 Mora IK (1–3, 0–0, 1–3, attendance 2,881)
KB Karlskoga defeats Bodens BK
First leg: KB Karlskoga 7–3 Bodens BK (1–2, 1–1, 5–0, attendance 2,695)
Second leg: Bodens BK 6–5 KB Karlskoga (2–2, 3–1, 1–2, attendance 2,724)KB Karlskoga wins in sudden-death overtime
Örebro IK defeats Malmö IF
First leg: Örebro IK 8–2 Malmö IF (2–1, 3–0, 3–1, attendance: 4,572)
Second leg: Malmö IF 5–3 Örebro IK (1–1, 1–1, 3–1, attendance: 2,171)Örebro IK wins in sudden-death overtime
HV 71 defeats Huddinge IK
First leg: Huddinge IK 6–5 HV 71 (1–1, 3–1, 2–3, attendance 1,247)
Second leg: HV 71 14–4 Huddinge IK (5–1, 9–3, 0–0, attendance 4,800)HV 71 wins in sudden-death overtime
Nacka SK defeats Tingsryds AIF
First leg: Tingsryds AIF 2–3 Nacka SK (1–2, 0–0, 1–1, attendance 1,802)
Second leg: Nacka SK 1–1 Tingsryds AIF (0–1, 1–0, 0–0, attendance 852)
BK Bäcken defeats Västerås IK
First leg: Västerås IK 0–2 BK Bäcken (0–1, 0–1, 0–0, attendance: 3,277)
Second leg: BK Bäcken 7–2 Västerås IK (4–1, 1–0, 2–1, attendance 3,692)

Round 2
IF Björklöven defeats KB Karlskoga
First leg: IF Björklöven 5–3 KB Karlskoga (0–2, 4–0, 1–1, attendance: 2,282)
Second leg: KB Karlskoga 4–4 IF Björklöven (1–2, 1–0, 2–2, attendance: 4,054)
Mora IK defeats Strömsbro IF
First leg: Strömsbro IF 5–5 Mora IK (2–1, 1–1, 2–3, attendance: 1,669)
Second leg: Mora IK 5-3 Strömsbro IF (1–1, 2–1, 2–1, attendance 2,096)
Örebro IK defeats BK Bäcken
First leg: Örebro IK 2–4 BK Bäcken (1–1, 0–2, 1–1, attendance: 5,985)
Second leg: BK Bäcken 2–4 Örebro IK (0–2, 2–2, 0–0, attendance: 4,225)

Örebro IK wins in sudden-death overtime
Nacka SK defeats HV 71
First leg: HV 71 1–2 Nacka SK (1–1, 0–0, 0–1, attendance: 4,800)
Second leg: Nacka SK 3–2 HV 71 (1–0, 0–0, 2–2, attendance: 840)

Elitserien qualifier
The four playoff winners played a double-round robin tournament, with the top two teams being promoted to Elitserien for the 1976–77 season, replacing the two teams with the poorest records from the 1975–76 Elitserien.

External links
Historical Division 1 statistics on Svenskhockey.com

Swedish Division I seasons
2
Swe